October 13 - Eastern Orthodox liturgical calendar - October 15

All fixed commemorations below celebrated on October 27 by Eastern Orthodox Churches on the Old Calendar.

For October 14th, Orthodox Churches on the Old Calendar commemorate the Saints listed on October 1.

Saints
 Great-Martyrs Nazarius, Celsius, Gervasius and Protasius, of Milan (54-68)  (see also: June 19, July 25)
 Martyr Peter Apselamus of Eleutheropolis in Palestine (309)
 Hieromartyr Silvanus of Gaza, Priest, and with him 40 martyrs, by beheading (311)  (see also: May 4)
 Saint Cosmas the Hymnographer, Bishop of Maiuma (787)  (see also: October 12)
 Venerable Parasceva (Petka) of Epibatima Thrace (Parascevi the New), whose relics are in Iași, Romania (11th century)

Pre-Schism Western saints
 Saint Callistus I, Pope of Rome (c. 222)
 Saint Gaudentius of Rimini, Bishop of Rimini and Martyr (360)
 Saint Donatian of Reims (Donas), Bishop of Rheims (390)
 Saint Justus of Lyons, Bishop of Lyons (390)  (see also: September 2)
 Saint Manehildis (Ménéhould), patroness of Sainte-Menehould (c. 490)
 Saint Fortunatus of Todi, a Bishop of Todi in Italy, who saved the city from being sacked by Totila the Goth (537)
 Saint Rusticus, Bishop of Trier in Germany, he resigned to live at the hermitage of St Goar (574)
 Venerable Mannacus, Abbot at Caer Gybi, Holyhead, Anglesey (6th century)
 Saint Angadresima (Angadrisma, Angadreme), Abbess of Oröer-des-Vierges near Beauvais (c. 695)
 Saint Burchard of Würzburg, first Bishop of Wurzburg, English missionary to Germany (754)
 Saint Bernard of Arce, Confessor (9th century)

Post-Schism Orthodox saints
 Venerable Nikola Sviatosha, Prince of Chernigov and Wonderworker, of the Kiev Caves (1143)
 Saint Cosmas, founder of Yakhromsk Monastery, Vladimir (1492)
 Saint Ignatius the Wonderworker, Metropolitan of Mithymna (1566)

New Martys and Confessors
 New Hieromartyr Michael Lektorsky, Priest (1921)
 New Hieromartyr Ambrose (Polyansky), Bishop of Kamenetz-Podolsk (1932)
 New Hieromartyr Peter Lebedev, Priest (1937)
 New Hieromartyr Maximilian Marchenko (1938)

Other commemorations
 Death of Harold Godwinson, last Orthodox king of England, and those killed with him at the Battle of Hastings (1066)
 Commemoration of the Miracle of St. Paraskevi on the island of Chios (1442)
 Yakhromsk Icon of the Most Holy Theotokos (15th century)

Icon gallery

Notes

References

Sources 
 October 14/27. Orthodox Calendar (PRAVOSLAVIE.RU).
 October 27 / October 14. HOLY TRINITY RUSSIAN ORTHODOX CHURCH (A parish of the Patriarchate of Moscow).
 October 14. OCA - The Lives of the Saints.
 The Autonomous Orthodox Metropolia of Western Europe and the Americas (ROCOR). St. Hilarion Calendar of Saints for the year of our Lord 2004. St. Hilarion Press (Austin, TX). p. 76.
 The Fourteenth Day of the Month of October. Orthodoxy in China.
 October 14. Latin Saints of the Orthodox Patriarchate of Rome.
 The Roman Martyrology. Transl. by the Archbishop of Baltimore. Last Edition, According to the Copy Printed at Rome in 1914. Revised Edition, with the Imprimatur of His Eminence Cardinal Gibbons. Baltimore: John Murphy Company, 1916. pp. 317–318.
 Rev. Richard Stanton. A Menology of England and Wales, or, Brief Memorials of the Ancient British and English Saints Arranged According to the Calendar, Together with the Martyrs of the 16th and 17th Centuries. London: Burns & Oates, 1892. pp. 492–493.
Greek Sources
 Great Synaxaristes:  14 ΟΚΤΩΒΡΙΟΥ. ΜΕΓΑΣ ΣΥΝΑΞΑΡΙΣΤΗΣ.
  Συναξαριστής. 14 Οκτωβρίου. ECCLESIA.GR. (H ΕΚΚΛΗΣΙΑ ΤΗΣ ΕΛΛΑΔΟΣ).
  14/10/2017. Ορθόδοξος Συναξαριστής. 
Russian Sources
  27 октября (14 октября). Православная Энциклопедия под редакцией Патриарха Московского и всея Руси Кирилла (электронная версия). (Orthodox Encyclopedia - Pravenc.ru).
  14 октября по старому стилю / 27 октября по новому стилю. Русская Православная Церковь - Православный церковный календарь на 2016 год.

October in the Eastern Orthodox calendar